This is a list of villages in Trøndelag, a county of Norway. For other counties see the lists of villages in Norway.  The list excludes towns and cities located in Trøndelag.

References

External links

Trondelag